Pinnacle is an adventure for fantasy role-playing games published by Mayfair Games in 1986.

Plot summary
Pinnacle is a scenario for character levels 4-5 involving a tournament where the challenge is to climb the Pinnacle, an unclimbable mountain.  But the mountain is hollow, and an ancient secret waits inside.

This adventure concerns a race to the top of a mountain organized by the Gentlemen's Adventuring Society, a kind of safari club for aristocrats.  A mystery hangs over the society, and the player characters will need investigative skills as well as climbing and fighting ability to deal with a couple of new monsters.

Publication history
Pinnacle was written by Dan Greenberg, with a cover by Stephen Venters,  and was published by Mayfair Games in 1986 as a 32-page book. The adventure module was part of the Role Aids line.

Reception
Graeme Davis reviewed Pinnacle for White Dwarf #90. He commented that "Pinnacle has an interesting cover, with three practically-naked people attempting to die of frostbite up a mountain." Davis concluded his review by saying, "The climb itself takes up nearly a third of the 32 pages, and is entertaining as well as challenging.  The whole adventure will appeal to a group who prefer investigation and role-playing to simple dungeon bashes, and with a GM who is good at colourful NPCs, it could be a real delight."

References

Fantasy role-playing game adventures
Role Aids
Role-playing game supplements introduced in 1986